Nate Kazebier (August 13, 1912 – October 22, 1969) was an American jazz trumpeter.

Kazebier started on trumpet at age nine. His early experience was in territory bands in the Midwest, with Austin Wylie, Jan Garber, and Slats Randall. In 1935-36 he played in Benny Goodman's band, then moved to California, where he played with Ray Noble, Seger Ellis, Spud Murphy, and others. In 1939-40 he was a member of Gene Krupa's first big band, then worked with Jimmy Dorsey from 1940-1943. He spent time in the military during World War II, then returned to play with Goodman in 1946-47. From the late 1940s into the 1960s, he worked in the studios in California, playing with Ray Bauduc among many others. He never led his own recording date.

References
Scott Yanow, [ Nate Kazebier] at Allmusic

External links
 Nate Kazebier recordings at the Discography of American Historical Recordings.

Further reading
Barry Kernfeld, The New Grove Dictionary of Jazz.

1912 births
1969 deaths
American jazz trumpeters
American male trumpeters
20th-century American musicians
20th-century trumpeters
20th-century American male musicians
American male jazz musicians